Etawah district is one of the districts in the western portion of Uttar Pradesh state of India. Etawah town is the district headquarters. The district covers an area of 2311 km. It has a population of 1,581,810.

Demographics

According to the 2011 census Etawah district has a population of 1,581,810. This gives it a ranking of 316th in India (out of a total of 640). Its population growth rate over the decade 2001-2011 was 12.91%. Etawah has a sex ratio of 970 females for every 1000 males, and a literacy rate of 70.14%. Scheduled Castes made up 24.55% of the population.

Hindus predominate in rural areas (nearly 97%). The vast majority of Muslims are urban and make up 20% of urban population in the district.

At the time of the 2011 Census of India, 98.18% of the population in the district spoke Hindi (or a related language) and 1.75% Urdu as their first language.

Administration
The Etawah district is headed by an IAS officer of the rank of District Magistrate (DM). The district is further sub-divided into sub-divisions or Tehsils, each headed by a Sub Divisional Magistrate (SDM). 

These Tehsils are further divided into Blocks,  each headed by a Block development officer (BDO).

Tehsils
The six sub-divisions or Tehsils in Etawah are as follows:
 Etawah
 Bharthana
 Jaswantnagar
 Saifai
 Chakarnagar
 Takha

Blocks
The eight Blocks in Etawah are as follows:

 Barhpur
 Basrehar
 Jaswantnagar
 Mahewa
 Saifai
 Chakarnagar
 Takha
 Bharthana

Education

Universities

Faculties of Agricultural Engineering and Technology, Dairy Technology and Fisheries Science of Chandra Shekhar Azad University of Agriculture and Technology named Baba Saheb Dr. B.R.A. College of Agriculture Engineering & Technology, College of Dairy Technology and College of Fisheries Science and Research Centre, established during 1994–95, 2015–16 and 2015–16 respectively.
Uttar Pradesh University of Medical Sciences (formerly U.P. Rural Institute of Medical Sciences and Research) Saifai, Etawah is a medical research public university, established by Government of Uttar Pradesh under Act 15 of 2016. The university is running full-fledged Medical College, Paramedical College, Nursing College, Pharmacy College, Multi Specialty 850 bedded hospital and 150 bedded trauma and burn centre. 500 bedded super specialty hospital is being established in the university by Government of Uttar Pradesh with budget of 650 crores.

Schools and colleges
Chaudhary Charan Singh Post Graduate College, Heonra-Saifai, Etawah or Chaudhary Charan Singh Degree College is a college offering under-graduate and post-graduate courses in Science, Arts, Law, Commerce, Computer, Management, Education and Physical Education faculties. The college is situated in Heonra village which is part of Saifai Block (Vikas Khand) and neighbour village of Saifai village. The college is affiliated to Chhatrapati Shahu Ji Maharaj University (formerly Kanpur University).
District Institute of Education and Training is a B.T.C. training college. It offers 2 year B.T.C. which is also known as Diploma in Elementary Education (D.El.Ed.) outside Uttar Pradesh.
Government Girls Post Graduate College, Etawah is government women's college offering BA, BCom and MA courses in Etawah.
Janta College Bakewar, Etawah is a college offering courses in Mathematics, Computer Science, Industrial chemistry, Biotechnology, Commerce and Agriculture. The college is affiliated to Chhatrapati Shahu Ji Maharaj University (formerly Kanpur University). It is considered as a top notch institution for science. It is accredited 'B' grade from NAAC.
Karm Kshetra Post Graduate College or K.K. P.G. College, Etawah is a college offering under-graduate and post-graduate courses in Science, Arts, Commerce faculties. The college is affiliated to Chhatrapati Shahu Ji Maharaj University (formerly Kanpur University).
Major Dhyan Chand Sports College, Saifai (Etawah) is a residential sports college in Saifai, established in 2014. It offers teaching from 6th to 12th standard and by the curriculum of Board of High School and Intermediate Education, Uttar Pradesh (U.P. Board) and sports training in cricket, football, hockey, wrestling, athletics, badminton, swimming and kabaddi.
Pharmacy College Saifai, established in 2015, only government aided pharmacy college run by UP Government. Earlier affiliated with UPTU, now part of Uttar Pradesh University of Medical Sciences.
S.S. Memorial Educational Academy, Saifai, Etawah is a private B.T.C. training college. It offers 2 year B.T.C. which is also known as Diploma in Elementary Education (D.El.Ed.) outside Uttar Pradesh.
S.S. Memorial Senior Secondary Public School, Saifai, Etawah is a co-ed institute with English as the medium of instruction. The school is affiliated to CBSE, New Delhi and NCERT published books are introduced form class VI and onwards.

Temple
Kundeshwar Mahdev Mandir at Kundeshwar Agra Road Etawah

Hajari Mahadev Temple at Sarsai Nawar

Maa Kalka Devi

Nagar Panchayat
 Bakewar
 Ekdil
 Lakhna

Tourism 

Sarsai Nawar Wetland is a bird sanctuary and a protected area.

Hospitals
 Community Hospital Sarsai, Sarsai Nawar
 Uttar Pradesh University of Medical Science, Saifai

Community Hospital centre
Bharthana*

Notable people 
 
 
Sarita Bhadauria (b 1963) - politician and member of 17th Legislative Assembly of Uttar Pradesh 
Akhilesh Yadav (b 1973) - politician and member of 17th Lok Sabha
Mulayam Singh Yadav (1939-2022) - politician and founder of the Samajwadi Party

Expressway 
Bundelkhand Expressway in Etawah District.
Chambal Expressway connect Etawah To Kota.

References

External links

 

 
Districts of Uttar Pradesh